Andrew Martin Siegert (born 18 January 1982) is an Australian rules footballer. He made his debut in 2002 for Fremantle in the Australian Football League and was known for his hard approach as a tagger or "run-with" player.

Recruited from the Geelong Falcons in the TAC Cup and originally from Colac, Victoria, he had a solid debut season in 2002, playing 21 games, but only managed a further 15 games over the next three seasons.  At the end of the 2005 season, Fremantle delisted Siegert. He trained with Geelong, but was not picked up by an AFL club in the subsequent pre-season draft.

He remained in Western Australia and continued to play for South Fremantle in the West Australian Football League (WAFL) until retiring in 2010.

References

External links 

WAFL playing statistics

1982 births
Living people
Australian rules footballers from Victoria (Australia)
Geelong Falcons players
Colac Football Club players
Fremantle Football Club players
South Fremantle Football Club players
People from Colac, Victoria